Bikhray Moti is a 2020 Pakistani television series that premiered on 26 May 2020, on ARY Digital. It is co-produced by Humayun Saeed and Samina Humayun Saeed under their banners Six Sigma Plus and Next Level Entertainment. Starring Neelam Muneer, Yasir Nawaz, and Wahaj Ali, it revolves around Ayeza, played by Muneer, a strong and independent girl who after her sister's death has no choice but to obtain custody of her niece and nephews by marrying her cruel brother-in-law. It ended later In November.

Cast 

 Yasir Nawaz as Zulfiqar aka Zulfi
 Neelam Muneer as Ayeza
 Wahaj Ali as Ahad
 Samina Ahmad as Shamsa, Zulfi's mother
 Waseem Abbas as Gulzar, Ayeza's father
 Rashid Farooqui as Tufail
 Shaista Jabeen as Shehnaz, Ayeza's mother
 Fareeda Shabbir as Qudsia
 Saleem Mairaj as Ghulam, Qudsia's husband
 Anas Yasin as Janu
 Faiza Gillani as Shaggo
 Tabbasum Arif as Jehangir's mother
 Nausheen Shah as Faiza
 Hassam Khan

Production 

After the success of the 2018 romantic drama Dil Mom Ka Diya, the director Shahid Shafaat, and producer Humayun Saeed, Samina Humayun Saeed decided to re-unite for another project with a family drama theme. They decided to cast the same lead i.e. Muneer and Nawaz, and announced their project in August 2019.

The first and second teaser was released by ARY Digital on 18 May 2020.

Awards and nominations

References 

2020 Pakistani television series debuts
Urdu-language television shows
ARY Digital original programming
Pakistani drama television series
2020 Pakistani television series endings
Television shows set in Karachi
Pakistani television series endings